Generosity (also called largess) is the virtue of being liberal in giving, often as gifts. Generosity is regarded as a virtue by various world religions and philosophies, and is often celebrated in cultural and religious ceremonies. Scientific investigation into generosity has examined the effect of a number of scenarios and games on individuals' generosity, and potential links with neurochemicals such as oxytocin, and relationship with similar feelings, such as that of empathy.

Other uses

Generosity is sometimes used to denote charity (the virtue of giving without expecting anything in return). It can involve offering time, assets or talents to aid someone in need. In times of natural disaster, relief efforts are frequently provided, voluntarily, by individuals or groups acting unilaterally in making gifts of time, resources, goods, money, etc. Generosity, or charity, is most impactful on an individual's life when it is not provided under the direct order or guidance of an organization. Many individuals tend to experience more joy and satisfaction when they can change someone's life through personal acts of generosity. Therefore, generosity is a guiding principle for many registered charities, foundations, non-profit organizations, etc.

Although the term generosity often goes hand-in-hand with charity, many people in the public's eye want recognition for their good deeds. Donations are needed to support organizations and committees, however, generosity should not be limited to times of great need such as natural disasters and extreme situations. Individuals as well as organizations should always be looking to commit acts of generosity whenever and wherever they are needed.

Etymology
The modern English word generosity derives from the Latin word generōsus, which means "of noble birth", which itself was passed down to English through the Old French word généreux. The Latin stem gener– is the declensional stem of genus, meaning "kin", "clan", "race", or "stock", with the root Indo-European meaning of gen being "to beget". The same root gives the words genesis, gentry, gender, genital, gentile, genealogy, and genius, among others.

Most recorded English uses of the word generous up to and during the sixteenth century reflect an aristocratic sense of being of noble lineage or high birth. To be generous was literally a way of complying with nobility.

During the 17th century, however, the meaning and use of the word began to change. Generosity came increasingly to identify not literal family heritage but a nobility of spirit thought to be associated with high birth—that is, with various admirable qualities that could now vary from person to person, depending not on family history but on whether a person actually possessed the qualities. In this way generosity increasingly came in the 17th century to signify a variety of traits of character and action historically associated (whether accurately or not) with the ideals of actual nobility: gallantry, courage, strength, richness, gentleness, and fairness. In addition to describing these diverse human qualities, generous became a word during this period used to describe fertile land, the strength of animal breeds, abundant provisions of food, vibrancy of colors, the strength of liquor, and the potency of medicine.

Then, during the 18th century, the meaning of generosity continued to evolve in directions denoting the more specific, contemporary meaning of munificence, open–handedness, and liberality in the giving of money and possessions to others. This more specific meaning came to dominate English usage by the 19th century. Over the last five centuries in the English speaking world, generosity developed from being primarily the description of an ascribed status pertaining to the elite nobility to being an achieved mark of admirable personal quality and action capable of being exercised in theory by any person who had learned virtue and noble character (Smith 2009).

In religion

In Buddhism, generosity is one of the Ten Perfections and is the antidote to the self-chosen poison called greed. Generosity is known as dāna in the Eastern religious scriptures.

In Islam, Quran states that whatever one gives away generously, with the intention of pleasing God, He will replace it. God knows what is in the hearts of men. Say: “Truly, my Lord enlarges the provision for whom He wills of His slaves, and also restricts it) for him, and whatsoever you spend of anything (in God’s Cause), He will replace it. And He is the Best of providers.” (Quran 34:39)

In Christianity, in the Acts of the Apostles, Paul the Apostle reports that Jesus had said that giving is better than receiving (Acts 20:35), although the gospels do not record this as a saying of Jesus. In his first letter to Timothy, Paul tells rich Christians that they must be "generous and willing to share". (1 Timothy 6:18) Later Christian tradition further developed the concept of the virtue of charity.

In philosophy
Immanuel Kant also contemplates generosity in an universal and uninterested form in his formulation and development of the categorical imperative.

In knowledge
 Missionary Church of Kopimism says that all knowledge is for everyone and copying or sharing information is sacred.
 According to the Bible, having all the knowledge in the world is useless, without the desire for charity (sharing):

 In the Bible, obstruction of the flow of knowledge is suggested to be the destruction of mankind:

 Vidya Daan(विद्या दान) translated as knowledge charity, a concept in daan, is a tenet of all Dharmic religions that also values the sharing of knowledge.
Gyan yoga/Jnana yoga(ज्ञान योग) translated as wisdom exercise or knowledge path, is the sacred search for true knowledge, in all Dharmic religions.
 In Hinduism, right knowledge is a form of God, and anything knowledge is written or recorded on is considered sacred, to be protected from obscurity:
अपूर्व: कोपि कोशोयं विद्यते तव भारति |व्ययतो वॄद्धिम् आयाति क्षयम् आयाति संचयात् ||
 Translation: Oh Goddess Saraswati, your treasure of knowledge (Vidya) is indeed very amazing! If used(shared) it grows and if unused(obscured) it shrinks!
In Islam, the prophet Muhammad said: "Wisdom is the lost property of the faithful; wherever he finds it he has the right to take it"
Muhammad also said: "Whoever is asked about a knowledge that he knows about and then hides it and keeps it away, he will be bridled on the day of judgement with a bridle of fire."

Research and scholarship 
Research has shown that generosity is associated with empathy. In this research, by  Paul J. Zak and colleagues and published in Public Library of Science ONE, the peptide oxytocin or placebo was given to about 100 men and then they made several decisions regarding money.  One, the Dictator Game, was used to measure altruism by asking people to make a unilateral transfer of $10 they were given by the experimenters to a stranger in the lab; oxytocin had no effect on altruism. Another task, the Ultimatum Game, was used to measure generosity. In this game, one person was endowed with $10 and was asked to offer some split of it to another person in the lab, all done by computer.  If the second person did not like the split, he could reject it (for example, if it was stingy) and both people would get zero.  In a clever twist, the researchers told participants they would be randomly chosen to be either the person making the offer or the person responding to it. This required the person making the offer to take the other's perspective explicitly. Generosity was defined as an offer greater than the minimum amount needed for acceptance. Oxytocin increased generosity 80% compared to those on placebo. In addition, oxytocin was quantitatively twice as important in predicting generosity as was altruism.

Research indicates that higher-income individuals are less generous than poorer individuals, and that a perceived higher economic inequality leads higher-income individuals to be less generous.

The science of generosity initiative at the University of Notre Dame is investigating the sources, origins, and causes of generosity; manifestations and expressions of generosity; and consequences of generosity for both the givers and receivers involved. Generosity for the purposes of this project is defined as the virtue of giving good things to others empathycally and abundantly.

The external situation was studied by Milan Tsverkova and Michael W. Macy. The social contagion of generosity affected the level of people's generosity. Two methods, generalized reciprocity and third parity influence (the observation to others’ generosity behavior), of generosity behavior contagion were studied. The results show that these methods are improving the frequency of generosity; however, the willingness to contribute also causes bystander effect which lower the frequency of generosity behaviors.

Peer punishment is significant in cooperation in human groups. At the proximate level of analysis, it takes a punitive action to explain the amount of time in a theoretical way. Any participants of punishers and non-punishers were selected to interact with each other during the laboratory experiments. Researchers investigate the trust game to punishers as the punishment of their selfishness, comparing any non-punishers argument if they understood the act of generosity. Money might change the atmosphere between punishers and non-punishers. As a result, punishers are not trusting more than non-punishers. They believe in generosity that is something to decide what is capable of being trustworthy.

See also

 Altruism
 Ambitus
 Dāna
 Largitio
 Kindness
 Magnanimity
 Philanthropy
 Selfishness
 Selfless service
 Categorical imperative

References

External links

 Smith, Christian. 2009.
 Center for Neuroeconomics Studies
 Media coverage of generosity and oxytocin
 Shareable: News on Sharing
 On Generosity

Philanthropy
Social concepts
Virtue
Fruit of the Holy Spirit